The Soldier and the Lady is the 1937 American adventure film version of the oft-produced 1876 Jules Verne novel, Michel Strogoff.  Produced by Pandro S. Berman, he hired as his associate producer, Joseph Ermolieff.  Ermolieff had produced two earlier versions of the film, Michel Strogoff in France, and The Czar's Courier in Germany, both released in 1936. Both the earlier films had starred the German actor Adolf Wohlbrück. Berman also imported Wohlbrück, changing his name to Anton Walbrook to have him star in the American version. Other stars of the film were Elizabeth Allan, Margot Grahame, Akim Tamiroff, Fay Bainter and Eric Blore. RKO Radio Pictures had purchased the rights to the French version of the movie, and used footage from that film in the American production.  The film was released on April 9, 1937.

Plot
The Tsar sends courier Michael Strogoff to deliver vital information to Grand Duke Vladimir far away in Siberia. The Tartars, aided by renegade Ogareff, have risen up against the Russian Empire.

Cast
 Anton Walbrook as Michael Strogoff
 Elizabeth Allan as Nadia
 Akim Tamiroff as Ogareff
 Margot Grahame as Zangarra
 Fay Bainter as Strogoff's Mother
 Eric Blore as Blount
 Edward Brophy as Packer
 Paul Guilfoyle as Vasiley
 William Stack as Grand Duke
 Paul Harvey as Tsar
 Michael Visaroff as Innkeeper

Reception
Writing for Night and Day in 1937, Graham Greene gave the film a mildly positive review, claiming that this version of the film was a great cinematographic improvement of the 1926 classic directed by Ivan Mosjoukine. Comparing the film to a "dashing and open-air ... good Western" Greene found the film to be "motivated in the grand manner", and noted that although the film "remains incurably comic even in tragedy", it remains a "simple, passionate and certainly sensuous [film] like a poem for boys, and not a bad poem either."

References

External links
 
 
 
 

1930s historical adventure films
American historical adventure films
American black-and-white films
Films based on Michael Strogoff
RKO Pictures films
Films set in Russia
Films set in the 19th century
American remakes of German films
American remakes of French films
Films directed by George Nicholls Jr.
Films scored by Nathaniel Shilkret
1930s American films
1930s English-language films